Regenia Gagnier  (b. 24 June 1953) is a scholar of Victorian and modern British literature, the geopolitics of language and literature migration, world literatures and political economy, and Professor of English at the University of Exeter.

Biography
Gagnier was Professor of English at Stanford University from 1982-1996 and Professor of English at the University of Exeter since 1996. She received a Guggenheim Fellowship in 1991. She was elected as a Fellow of the Academy of Europe in 2014 and as a Fellow of the British Academy in 2020. She is also a Fellow of St Catherine's College, Oxford.

Select publications
Gagnier, R. 1986. Idylls of the Marketplace: Oscar Wilde and the Victorian Public. Stanford University Press.
Gagnier, R. 1991. Subjectivities: A History of Self-Representation in Britain 1832-1920. Oxford University Press.
Gagnier, R. 2000. The Insatiability of Human Wants: Economics and Aesthetics in Market Society. University of Chicago Press.
Gagnier, R. 2010. Individualism, Decadence and Globalization: On the Relationship of Part to Whole, 1859–1920. Palgrave Macmillan. 
Gagnier, R. 2018. Literatures of Liberalization: Global Circulation and the Long Nineteenth Century. Palgrave Macmillan.

External links
Regenia Gagnier on “World Literatures and What It Means to Be Human in the Niche of Nature, Culture, Technology”

References

Living people
1953 births
Fellows of the British Academy
Academia Europaea
Academics of the University of Exeter
English literature academics